Chang Pei-Wei (born March 10, 1979 ) is a Taiwanese pool and card player. Chang was the runner up at the 2004 WPA World Nine-ball Championship and won the gold medal at the World Games 2005.

Career 
In 2004, Chang reached the 13th place in the BCA Open 9-Ball Championship. Later, in the 2004 WPA World Nine-ball Championship, Chang won 7 games, but lost in the final against the Canadian Alex Pagulayan 13–17.

In 2005, he lost in the 2005 WPA World Nine-ball Championship in the round of the last 64, but won by a final victory against the German Thorsten Hohmann the gold medal at the 2005 World Games. In the World Pool League 2006, he finished fifth. At the 9-Ball World Championships in 2006 and 2007 he retired in the preliminary round. At the Japan Open in 2007 he reached the fifth place.

In the 10-Ball World Championships 2008 and 2009, he lost both each with a win in the preliminary round. At the China Open 2009, he finished 17th. At the 2008 WPA World Eight-ball Championship , he lost in the semifinals against the Frenchman Stephan Cohen. At the China Open 2013, he reached the 9th place.

References

External links 

Living people
1979 births
Taiwanese pool players
Place of birth missing (living people)